Maersk Drilling is a drilling-rig operator based in Lyngby, Denmark. Established in 1972, the company is a Nasdaq Copenhagen–listed company with the ticket name 'DRLCO'.

In November 2021, it was announced that Maersk Drilling will merge with Noble Corporation and the combined company will be called Noble Corporation, with a valuation of £2.6 billion.

Fleet

References

Drilling rig operators
Service companies of Denmark
Service companies based in Copenhagen
Danish companies established in 1972
Maersk